Dörte Lindner (born 22 March 1974) is a German diver who won a bronze medal at the 2000 Summer Olympics. Lindner also competed for USC and won the Pac-10 conference championships in the Women's 1m and 3m Springboard in 1998.

Lindner was born in Rostock, Mecklenburg-Vorpommern.

References
 sports-reference

1974 births
Living people
German female divers
Olympic divers of Germany
Divers at the 2000 Summer Olympics
Olympic bronze medalists for Germany
Sportspeople from Rostock
Olympic medalists in diving
Medalists at the 2000 Summer Olympics
Universiade medalists in diving
Universiade bronze medalists for Germany
Medalists at the 1995 Summer Universiade
20th-century German women
21st-century German women